Virginia Mayo (born Virginia Clara Jones; November 30, 1920 – January 17, 2005) was an American actress and dancer. She was in a series of comedy films with Danny Kaye and was Warner Brothers' biggest box-office money-maker in the late 1940s. She also co-starred in the 1946 Oscar-winning movie The Best Years of Our Lives and White Heat (1949).

Biography

Early life
Mayo was born in St. Louis, Missouri, the daughter of newspaper reporter Luke and his wife, Martha Henrietta (née Rautenstrauch) Jones. Her family had roots back to the earliest days of St Louis, including great-great-great grandfather Captain James Piggott, who founded East St. Louis, Illinois, in 1797. Young Virginia's aunt operated an acting school in the St. Louis area, which Virginia began attending at age six. She also had a series of dancing instructors engaged by her aunt.

Vaudeville
Following her graduation from Soldan High School in 1937, she landed her first professional acting and dancing jobs at the St. Louis Municipal Opera Theatre (more commonly known as The Muny) and in an act with six other girls at the Hotel Jefferson. Performer Andy Mayo, impressed with her ability, recruited her to appear in his act, "Morton and Mayo".

Mayo toured the American vaudeville circuit for three years, serving as ringmaster and comedic foil for "Pansy the Horse," as Mayo and his partner, Nonnie Morton, performed in a horse suit. They appeared together in some short films and were a huge hit at Billy Rose's Diamond Horseshoe nightclub in the Broadway theater district, where she was spotted by Samuel Goldwyn.

Broadway
In 1941, now officially known by her stage name Virginia Mayo, she got another career break as she appeared on Broadway with Eddie Cantor in Banjo Eyes.

Sam Goldwyn

In the early 1940s, Virginia Mayo's talent and striking beauty came to the attention of movie mogul Samuel Goldwyn, who signed her to an acting contract with his company.

Goldwyn only made a few films a year and usually loaned out the actors he had under contract to other producers. Her first notable role was in Jack London (1943), which starred her future husband Michael O'Shea for producer Samuel Bronston.

Goldwyn originally planned to feature her with Danny Kaye in the film Up in Arms, but he felt she needed more experience and gave the role to Constance Dowling. Mayo was placed in the chorus just so she could learn, but she was never officially a member of the Goldwyn Girls. Then RKO borrowed her for a support role in a musical, Seven Days Ashore (1944).

Stardom
Mayo's first starring role came in 1944 opposite comedian Bob Hope in The Princess and the Pirate (1944), a spoof of pirate movies made by Goldwyn. It earned over $3 million at the box office. Goldwyn then made her Danny Kaye's leading lady for the musicals Wonder Man (1945) and The Kid from Brooklyn (1946), both very popular.

Going against the previous stereotype, Mayo accepted the supporting role of unsympathetic gold-digger Marie Derry in William Wyler's drama The Best Years of Our Lives (1946) for Goldwyn. Her performance drew favorable reviews from critics, as the film also became the highest-grossing film in the US since Gone with the Wind. At the zenith of her career, Mayo was seen as the quintessential voluptuous Hollywood beauty. It was said that she "looked like a pinup painting come to life." According to widely published reports from the late 1940s, the Sultan of Morocco declared her beauty to be "tangible proof of the existence of God."

Eagle-Lion Films borrowed her to play the lead in Out of the Blue (1947), a comedy with George Brent.

Mayo was reunited with Kaye in The Secret Life of Walter Mitty (1947), another big success, and A Song Is Born (1948), a box office disappointment. In between, Warners borrowed her for the lead in a film noir, Smart Girls Don't Talk (1948).

Warner Bros

Warner Bros ended up taking over her contract from Goldwyn.  They starred her in another film noir, Flaxy Martin (1949) with Zachary Scott, then she did a Western with Joel McCrea and director Raoul Walsh, Colorado Territory (1949), and a comedy with Ronald Reagan, The Girl from Jones Beach (1949).

Mayo received excellent reviews in another unsympathetic role, playing James Cagney's sultry and scheming wife in the gangster classic White Heat (1949), also for Walsh. Mayo admitted she was frightened by Cagney as the psychotic gunman in White Heat because he was so realistic.

Roy Del Ruth borrowed her to play opposite George Raft in Red Light (1949) and she was Milton Berle's leading lady in Always Leave Them Laughing (1949).

Mayo was top billed in the film noir Backfire (1950), and she was a huge hit in The Flame and the Arrow (1950) as Burt Lancaster's love interest.

She co-starred again with James Cagney and a young Doris Day in The West Point Story (1950), singing and dancing with Cagney, and was Gregory Peck's leading lady in Captain Horatio Hornblower R.N. (1951), Warners most popular film of the year. She co-starred with Kirk Douglas in a Western for Walsh, Along the Great Divide (1951).

Mayo starred opposite Dennis Morgan in David Butler's Technicolor musical, Painting the Clouds with Sunshine (1951) which was a moderate success. While Mayo appeared in several musicals, using her dance training, her voice was always dubbed.

Mayo appeared in the all-star cast of Starlift (1951) and was top billed in She's Working Her Way Through College (1952) with Reagan. She was Alan Ladd's leading lady in The Iron Mistress (1952), a popular biopic of Jim Bowie, and starred in another musical, She's Back on Broadway (1953).

Mayo appeared in the comedy-drama-action film South Sea Woman (1953) with Burt Lancaster and Chuck Connors. RKO borrowed her for a Western in 3-D, Devil's Canyon (1953), and she co-starred with Rex Harrison and George Sanders in King Richard and the Crusaders (1954).

She was top billed in The Silver Chalice (1954) opposite Pier Angeli and Paul Newman in his film debut.  The film was a notorious flop.

Post-Warners
Benedict Bogeaus gave her the lead in Pearl of the South Pacific (1955). Edmund Grainger cast her in Great Day in the Morning (1956), with Robert Stack, directed by Jacques Tourneur.

Mayo went to 20th Century Fox to play Robert Ryan's leading lady in The Proud Ones (1956) then she did Congo Crossing (1956) at Universal.

Mayo was reunited with Ladd in The Big Land (1957) made back at Warners. She played Cleopatra in the 1957 fantasy film The Story of Mankind.  

Mayo made The Tall Stranger (1957) with McCrea for Allied Artists, Fort Dobbs (1958) with Clint Walker at Warners and Westbound (1959) with Randolph Scott at Warners. Her last film of the decade was 1959's Jet Over the Atlantic. She began guest starring on television shows such as Wagon Train, The Loretta Young Show, and Lux Playhouse.

1960s
Mayo and her husband made a pilot for a TV series McGarry and His Mouse (1960), which was not picked up. She went to Italy to make Revolt of the Mercenaries (1961).

Mayo's film career tapered off considerably. She appeared in Young Fury (1965) with Rory Calhoun, Castle of Evil (1966), and Fort Utah (1967) with John Ireland.  She also guests starred on shows such as Burke's Law and Daktari and appeared onstage in such plays as That Certain Girl (1967) and Barefoot in the Park (1968).

Later career
Mayo acted on stage for the rest of her career, mostly in dinner theatre and touring shows. Productions included No, No Nanette (1972), 40 Carats (1975), Good News (1977), Move Over Mrs Markham (1980) and Butterflies Are Free (1981).

Mayo continued to occasionally appear on television in shows such as Police Story, Night Gallery, The Love Boat, Remington Steele, and Murder, She Wrote, and a dozen episodes of the soap opera Santa Barbara.

Mayo was one of many famous actors to make a cameo appearance in the all-star box office bomb Won Ton Ton, the Dog Who Saved Hollywood (1976). She had roles in Lanigan's Rabbi (1977), Haunted (1977), and French Quarter (1978). Later film appearances were in Evil Spirits (1990), Midnight Witness (1993) and The Man Next Door (1997), which was her last film role.

Mayo was one of the first to be awarded a star on the Hollywood Walk of Fame. Hers is located at 1751 Vine Street. In 1996, she was honored by her hometown as she received a star on the St. Louis Walk of Fame. In 1993, Mayo published a Christmas themed children's book entitled, Don't Forget Me, Santa Claus through Barrons Juveniles Publishers.

Personal life

Mayo wed Michael O'Shea in 1947, and they remained married until he died in 1973. The couple had one child, Mary Catherine O'Shea (born in 1953). For several decades, the family lived in Thousand Oaks, California.

In later years, she developed a passion for painting and also occupied her time doting on her three grandsons. She converted to Roman Catholicism, inspired by Archbishop Fulton J. Sheen. A lifelong Republican, she endorsed Richard Nixon in 1968 and 1972, and longtime friend Ronald Reagan in 1980.

Death
Mayo died of pneumonia and complications of congestive heart failure in the Los Angeles area on January 17, 2005, aged 84, at a nursing home in Thousand Oaks. Her death was reported the next day in The New York Times. She is buried next to O'Shea  in Pierce Brothers Valley Oaks Park in Westlake Village, California.

Filmography

Features

 Follies Girl (1943) as Chorine (uncredited)
 Jack London (1943) as Mamie
 Up in Arms (1944) as Nurse Joanna (uncredited)
 Seven Days Ashore (1944) as Carol Dean
 The Princess and the Pirate (1944) as Princess Margaret
 Wonder Man (1945) as Ellen Shanley
 The Kid from Brooklyn (1946) as Polly Pringle
 The Best Years of Our Lives (1946) as Marie Derry
 Out of the Blue (1947) as Deborah Tyler
 The Secret Life of Walter Mitty (1947) as Rosalind van Hoorn
 Smart Girls Don't Talk (1948) as Linda Vickers
 A Song Is Born (1948) as Honey Swanson
 Flaxy Martin (1949) as Flaxy Martin
 Colorado Territory (1949) as Colorado Carson
 The Girl from Jones Beach (1949) as Ruth Wilson
 White Heat (1949) as Verna Jarrett
 Red Light (1949) as Carla North
 Always Leave Them Laughing (1949) as Nancy Eagen
 Backfire (1950) as Nurse Julie Benson
 The Flame and the Arrow (1950) as Anne de Hesse
 The West Point Story (1950) as Eve Dillon
 Captain Horatio Hornblower (1951) as Lady Barbara Wellesley
 Along the Great Divide (1951) as Ann Keith
 Painting the Clouds with Sunshine (1951) as Carol
 Starlift (1951) as Virginia Mayo
 She's Working Her Way Through College (1952) as Angela Gardner / 'Hot Garters Gertie'
 The Iron Mistress (1952) as Judalon de Bornay
 She's Back on Broadway (1953) as Catherine Terris
 South Sea Woman (1953) as Ginger Martin
 Devil's Canyon (1953) as Abby Nixon
 King Richard and the Crusaders (1954) as Lady Edith Plantagenet
 The Silver Chalice (1954) as Helene
 Pearl of the South Pacific (1955) as Rita Delaine
 The Proud Ones (1956) as Sally
 Great Day in the Morning (1956) as Ann Merry Alaine
 Congo Crossing (1956) as Louise Whitman
 The Big Land (1957) as Helen Jagger
 The Story of Mankind (1957) as Cleopatra
 The Tall Stranger (1957) as Ellen
 Fort Dobbs (1958) as Celia Gray
 Westbound (1959) as Norma Putnam
 Jet Over the Atlantic (1959) as Jean Gurney
 Revolt of the Mercenaries (1961) as Lady Patrizia, Duchessa di Rivalta
 Young Fury (1964) as Sara McCoy
 Castle of Evil (1966) as Mary Theresa 'Sable' Pulaski
 Fort Utah (1967) as Linda Lee
 Fugitive Lovers (1975) as Liz Trent
 Won Ton Ton, the Dog Who Saved Hollywood (1976) as Miss Battley
 Haunted (1977) as Michelle
 French Quarter (1978) as Countess Willie Piazza / Ida
 Remington Steele (1984, TV Series) as Herself
 Murder, She Wrote (1984, TV Series) as Elinor
 The Love Boat (1986, TV Series) as Virginia
 Evil Spirits (1990) as Janet Wilson
 Midnight Witness (1993) as Kitty
 The Man Next Door (1997) as Lucia (final film role)

Short subjects
 Gals and Gallons (1939) as Virginia Jones
 So You Think You're Not Guilty (1950) as Herself
 Screen Snapshots: Hollywood Night Life (1952) as Herself
 Screen Snapshots: Salute to Hollywood (1958) as Herself

Live theater
 That Certain Girl (1967, Thunderbird Hotel, Las Vegas)
 Barefoot in the Park (1968 National Company)
 No, No Nanette (1972 National Company)
 40 Carats (1975/May–June, Hayloft Dinner Theatre, Lubbock, Texas)
 Good News (1977, Paper Mill Playhouse)
 Mover Over Mrs. Markham (1980 National Tour)
 Butterflies Are Free (1981 Tour)
 Follies (1995, Houston and Seattle)

Radio appearances

References

External links

 
 
 
 

1920 births
2005 deaths
Deaths from pneumonia in California
20th-century American actresses
Actresses from St. Louis
American film actresses
American Roman Catholics
American television actresses
California Republicans
Converts to Roman Catholicism
Missouri Republicans
Vaudeville performers
Warner Bros. contract players
Burials at Valley Oaks Memorial Park
20th-century American women writers
Western (genre) film actresses
American musical theatre actresses
American radio actresses
American stage actresses
20th-century American singers
20th-century American women singers
21st-century American women